This Mystery is the second studio album by Nichole Nordeman.

Critical reception

This Mystery received two positive reviews from music critics. At AllMusic, William Ruhlmann writes that Nordeman concerns herself with the life application of the Gospel rather than religious minutia, when he states that this "may not sit well with the more doctrinaire of Christians, but those who struggle daily with reconciling their faith to contemporary life are likely to respond favorably." Founder Tony Cummings of Cross Rhythms says that "as art of the highest order, pop doesn't come much better."

Track listing

Personnel 
 Nicole Nordeman – lead and backing vocals, acoustic piano
 Mark Hammond – keyboards, programming, additional acoustic piano, bass, drums
 Roger Ryan – acoustic piano (11)
 Gary Burnette – acoustic guitar, electric guitars 
 Andrew Ramsey – electric guitars (6)
 John Catchings – cello (11), cello arrangements (11)
 Rob Mathes – string arrangements (5, 10)
 The Nashville String Machine – strings (5, 10)
 Fernando Ortega – harmony vocals (5)
 Geoff Thurman – backing vocals (7)

Production 
 Mark Hammond – producer, arrangements 
 Grant Cunningham – executive producer 
 Ronnie Brookshire – recording, mixing, string recording (5, 10)
 Dave Dillbeck – additional recording, mix assistant 
 John Saylor – string recording assistant (5, 10)
 Jay Wright – live recording (11)
 Dick Beetham – mastering 
 Mary Moore – production assistant 
 Proper Management – management

Studios
 Recorded at The Rec Room and The Tracking Room (Nashville, Tennessee).
 Mixed at The Bennett House (Franklin, Tennessee).
 Mastered at Tape To Tape Mastering (London, England).

Chart history

References

2000 albums
Nichole Nordeman albums